(short for "X-Dazedly-Ray") is a 1990 Japanese horizontally scrolling shooter released for the Sega Mega Drive. It contains six levels.

Plot
On the terrestrial planet Sephiroth, which is home to a variety of peaceful and prosperous advanced societies, an ancient evil has returned. A long time ago, a warmonger known only as Guardia was banished from the planet, but has finally returned with an entire space military. The Guardia Military soon invades Sephiroth and crushes its defenses with its long hardened space technology. Within time, a space fighter was developed to match the power of the Guardia Military. Based on Guardia's unknown desire for destruction and its own might, the ship was named the "XDR", or "X-Dazedly-Ray".

Gameplay 

Players pilot the titular ship through six different checkpoint-heavy levels, blasting various ground and sky forces. Rather than having Bomb weapons, the ship is equipped to fire a variety of different shots and smaller bombs. Players can collect power ups such as different firing weapons, ground-force bombs, a shield and Options, all of which are upgradable to three levels. Players can also change the ship's speed through four variations. Many of the end-level bosses require timed shots in exact hit points, similar to Gradius.

The XDR can use three different weapons from item pick-ups including its standard upgradable shot, missile pick-ups and Options. The ship can collect the Wide Beam/Vulcan shot, Laser and the Wave Shot. The missile pick-ups actually fire as ground force bombs that fire in four directions once fully upgraded. The ship's Options power up strangely in that the first selected Option encircles the ship, but the second and third power-ups cause the Option to follow the ship from behind rather than encircle it as well as multiply. The ship can also collect items such as a temporary shield and 1 Up icons.

Levels and bosses
Stage 1 – Skies of planet Sephiroth
Boss – Hatori-111: An enormous space fighter with appendages and laser weapons.

Stage 2 – Guardian Military Secret Base
Boss – Camio-573: A large war machine armed with impenetrable missiles that fire vertically.

Stage 3 – Ancient Ruins of Sephiroth
Boss – Itama-765: A large, sphere shaped war machine armed with spherical shield enemies.

Stage 4 – The Green Moon
Boss – Mobi-100: An enormous space fighter ship equipped with a laser shield.

Stage 5 – Space Area Jeriad
Boss – Isuda-255: A large space ship that is almost completely armored.

Stage 6 – Guardia Military Star Base
Boss – Star Breaker Rei

Reception

References

 XDR: X-Dazedly-Ray at GameFAQs

1990 video games
Affect (company) games
Japan-exclusive video games
Sega Genesis games
Sega Genesis-only games
Horizontally scrolling shooters
Video games developed in Japan